In Concert: A Benefit for the Crossroads Centre at Antigua is a live concert film featuring performances by the British blues musician Eric Clapton and invited friends, such as David Sanborn, Sheryl Crow, Mary J. Blige and Bob Dylan. The DVD and VHS formats were released on 26 October 1999 under license of Warner Bros. Records. The concert tickets revenue was donated to the Crossroads Centre Foundation. It was the first Crossroads Guitar Festival, although titled differently at the time. The release reached various national charts and sold more than 225,000 copies worldwide.

Chart performance
In Australia, the video album release was awarded a Platinum disc for shipments over 15,000 DVDs in 2005 by the Australian Recording Industry Association. In Concert: A Benefit for the Crossroads Centre at Antigua reached position two on the official music DVD chart compiled by the Associação Brasileira dos Produtores de Discos in Brazil and was certified with a Gold disc commemorating the sale of more than 25,000 copies in the country. In Denmark, the concert film reached number five on the Hitlisten Top 10 music video albums chart and was awarded a Gold status for DVD and VHS shipments of 25,000. The 1999 release peaked at number one on the Portuguese music video chart, selling more than 16,000 copies while on charting. It was certified double Platinum by the Associação Fonográfica Portuguesa in January 2000. In Sweden, In Concert: A Benefit for the Crossroads Centre at Antigua reached number nine on the Sverigetopplistan-chart. It was certified with a Gold disc on 28 October 1999 – two days after its release and quickly achieved a Platinum award on 29 October the same year. In the United Kingdom and the United States, the release was awarded a Gold and Platinum presentation by the British Phonographic Industry and the Recording Industry Association of America for shipments of respectively 25,000 and 100,000 units. In Portugal and Brazil, the video reached the year-end music DVD charts of 2000, where they placed themselves on rankings thirty-one and forty-five.

Personnel

Musicians and special guests
Eric Clapton – Guitar · Lead vocals
David Sanborn – Saxophone
Mary J. Blige – Lead vocals
Sheryl Crow – Lead vocals · Bass guitar
Bob Dylan – Guitar · Lead vocals
Andy Fairweather Low – Rhythm guitar · vocals
Nathan East – Bass guitar · vocals
Steve Gadd – Drums
Tim Carmon – Keyboards · Hammond Organ
Dave Delhomme – Keyboards · Hammond Organ
Tessa Niles – Background vocals
Katie Kissoon – Background vocals

Concert production team
J. Shannon Curran – Director of production
Rick Austin – Producer of show opening
John Beug – Executive producer
Eric Clapton – Executive producer
Joel Gallen – Out-producer
Rose-Ellen Iannucci – Line-producer
Wayne Isaak – Executive producer for VH1
Robert F. Katz – Executive producer for VH1
Jay Karas – Coordinating producer
John Sykes – Executive producer
Lili Fini Zanuck – Executive producer
Stephen 'Scooter' Weintraub – Executive producer

Other selected involvements
John Harris – Sound mix
Ted Hall – Post-production sound mix
Bryan Leskowicz – Sound assistant
Allen Branton – Lighting designer
Victor Fable – Lighting director
Nevis Cameron – Official photography
Virginia Lohle – Official photography
Gary Lanvy – Stage set
Albert Strittmatter – Show power
Dan Denitto – Dolly grip
Matty Randazzo – Video controller
John Meiklejohn – Camera operator

Critical reception

The Portuguese music journalist João Santos calls the video album "a great picture with great sound" for his review in the daily newspaper Público. He also notes "Eric Clapton having a fantastic performing ability", which is presented "in full circle" in the music movie. Santos also likes the "various special guests either singing or playing" on In Concert: A Benefit for the Crossroads Centre at Antigua. He rated the release with five out of five stars. AllMusic critic Heather Phares calls the track listing "a somewhat routine selection of Clapton's hits" and adds that "his collaborations with the aforementioned guests add some interesting twists". For his review, Phares notes "the unusual combination of Blige and Clapton […] works surprisingly well". Coming to the conclusion, the AllMusic critic thinks the release "is not Clapton's most inspired concert video and the disc offers little in the way of extra features, [but] still may please his hardcore fans". Phares awards the concert film three out of five possible stars. Critics from the music website Guitar Nine liked the Dolby Digital surround sound. Music journalists from Examiner.com called the release "great".

Chart positions

Weekly charts

Year-end charts

Certifications

References

External links
Content summary by the New York Times

Benefit concerts
Bob Dylan
British documentary films
Concert films
Eric Clapton video albums
Mary J. Blige
Sheryl Crow
Warner Records video albums
1990s English-language films
Films directed by Joel Gallen
1990s British films